Tô Linh Hương (born 1988 in Hanoi) is a Vietnamese businesswoman. She is the former Chairman and CEO of state-running real estate company Vinaconex - PVC (PVV), a construction investment joint stock company. Revenue in 2012 of PVV estimated 950 billion Dong (about 50 million dollars). She inaugurated for the post since April 2012. Her term was to last until April 2016, but she resigned in June 2012.

Early life and education
Tô Linh Hương was born in 1988 and graduated as a Bachelor of Arts holder at Vietnam's Institute of Press and Propaganda, while the time her father is the director of this Institute. Being a top score achiever in 2005's national university entrance exam, she is known for her excellence in both academic performance and extracurricular activity in Vietnam Communist Youth League, an organization which has trained enormous notable and high-profile communist party chiefs since the Party was found such as Vietnam’s PM Nguyễn Tấn Dũng or Vietnam General Secretary of Communist Party Nguyễn Phú Trọng.

Huong graduated with first class honor in 2009. Her topic of the graduate dissertation was about 'Foreign public relation in time of political crisis'. However, there's a rumor among students of the same batch that the reason she achieves such high score is from her father's power, not from her ability. 
In 2011, Huong finished her master's degree in "International Business" at University of Birmingham and drop-out from Ohio State University.

Personal life
Huong is the daughter of Tô Huy Rứa, Chief of Central Committee of the Communist Party of Vietnam. He is also among the most ten powerful members of the Standing Committee of the Vietnam's Politburo.

According to a formal statement from the real estate company, Ms. Huong has been appointed for the post as Chairman and CEO at an annual general meeting of shareholders on 14 April 2012. Huong was noted as among a growing number of offspring of families of senior national and provincial leaders commonly called 'Red Offspring' by the public.

References

External links
 24-year-old Girl Chairs Vinaconex-PVC 
 
 Vietnam’s ‘Red Offsprings’: Ms.Tô Linh Hương, 24, becomes CEO of state-running real estate company Vinaconex – PVC (PVV)

Vietnamese businesspeople
Living people
1988 births
Vietnamese communists